Mandalay Television is a television production company, founded in 1995, which is part of producer and businessman Peter Guber's Mandalay Entertainment.

History 
The television unit was founded at the same time as the parent studio Mandalay Entertainment. It originally had an exclusive deal with Sony Pictures Entertainment, who was producing shows and TV movies under the logos of Columbia Pictures Television and TriStar Television.

In 1997, it was sold to Lions Gate Entertainment. Two years later, it was split off from Lionsgate, and it became an independent organization again. In 1999, the deal with Columbia TriStar Television was extended.

In 2000, Elizabeth Stephen, who moved off from theatrical motion pictures joined the company, and it was head of the television movie division.

Television productions

Television shows

1990s

2000s

2020s

Television movies

1990s

2000s

2010s

References 

Television production companies of the United States
Entertainment companies based in California
Companies based in Los Angeles County, California
Entertainment companies established in 1995
1995 establishments in California
Fictional tigers
Former Lionsgate subsidiaries
1997 mergers and acquisitions
2008 mergers and acquisitions